Yannick Wilhelmi (born 12 October 2000 in Grabs) is a Swiss professional squash player. As of May 2021, he was ranked number 137 in the world.

References

2000 births
Living people
Swiss male squash players
Competitors at the 2022 World Games